Kabgian Rural District is a rural district (dehestan) in Kabgian District, Dana County, Kohgiluyeh and Boyer-Ahmad Province, Iran. At the 2006 census, its population (including Chitab, which was subsequently promoted to city status and detached from the rural district) was 8,094, in 1,729 families; excluding Chitab, the population (as of 2006) was 6,533, in 1,401 families. The rural district has 45 villages.

References 

Rural Districts of Kohgiluyeh and Boyer-Ahmad Province
Dana County